Natchez State Park is a state park in the U.S. state of Mississippi.

Activities and amenities
The park features boating and fishing on Natchez Lake, primitive and developed campsites, ten cabins, a nature trail and equestrian roadways, picnic area, and a 9-hole disc golf course. The state record largemouth bass, 18.15 pounds, was caught in Natchez Lake in 1992.

References

External links

State parks of Mississippi
Protected areas of Adams County, Mississippi
Natchez, Mississippi